Roca Formation may refer to:

 Roca Formation, Argentina, Paleocene geologic formation of Argentina
 Roca Formation (United States), Permian geologic formation of central United States
 Roca Blanca Formation, Jurassic geologic formation of Argentina